Songs from Dawson's Creek is the first soundtrack album for the teen drama television series Dawson's Creek. Released by Columbia Records and Sony Music after the broadcasting of the series' first season on The WB network, it features a set of pop rock and folk pop songs by artists such as Sophie B. Hawkins, Jessica Simpson, Shooter, Heather Nova, Adam Cohen, Sixpence None the Richer, and Paula Cole, most of which appeared during the series' second season.

A commercial success, it scattered two US charts hit singles, including Sixpence None the Richer's "Kiss Me" and Dawson's Creeks theme song "I Don't Want to Wait", and reached the top of the Australian Albums Chart. The album also peaked within the top in Austria, Norway, Sweden, and the United States. During it first sixth months of release, Songs from Dawson's Creek sold more than 1.5 million copies worldwide and was certified triple platinum by the Australian Recording Industry Association (ARIA) and gold by the Recording Industry Association of America (RIAA). In Australia, it became the fifth highest selling album of 1999.

Track listing

Charts

Weekly charts

Year-end charts

Certifications

Australian Version 
The Australian version featured the song Photograph by Australian band Something For Kate, instead of the U.S. bonus tracks. As a result, this version contained only fifteen tracks.

References

Dawson's Creek
Television soundtracks
1999 soundtrack albums
Columbia Records soundtracks